Vánočka is a plaited bread, baked in Czech Republic and Slovakia (in Slovak called vianočka) traditionally at Christmas time. Such special festive Christmas bread made from white flour, either in the form of a wedge or of plaited shape was first mentioned around 1400 by Benedictine monk Jan of Holešov in his work Treatise on Christmas Eve. According to his interpretation, this pastry symbolized Christ Child wrapped in cloth.

Vánočka was further referred to during the 16th century, where it could only be made by a baker who was a guild craftsman. During the 18th century, people took the recipe into their homes and began baking it themselves. It is rich in eggs and butter, making it similar to brioche. Lemon rind and rum add colour and flavour;   the dough can also contain raisins and almonds and is plaited like challah.  A vánočka may be built up from three progressively smaller plaits stacked on top of one another; this is sometimes interpreted as a rough sculpture of the baby Jesus wrapped in cloth and lying in a manger.

It has a reputation for being difficult to prepare, so in many households superstitions and special customs are attached to the baking process. When making vánočka, it is said that one must think of everyone dear to you. Another custom is to avoid touching the vánočka with metal. Finally, the person who is making the vánočka should jump up and down while the dough rises.

The bread is named after Vánoce meaning Christmas in Czech (Vianoce in Slovak).

Out of identical dough, a loaf called mazanec is made at Easter.

See also 
 Zopf
 Houska
 Hefekranz
 List of sweet breads

References 

Czech cuisine
Braided egg breads
Yeast breads
Sweet breads
Christmas food